The General Agreement on Tariffs and Trade (GATT) is a legal agreement between many countries, whose overall purpose was to promote international trade by reducing or eliminating trade barriers such as tariffs or quotas. According to its preamble, its purpose was the "substantial reduction of tariffs and other trade barriers and the elimination of preferences, on a reciprocal and mutually advantageous basis."

The GATT was first discussed during the United Nations Conference on Trade and Employment and was the outcome of the failure of negotiating governments to create the International Trade Organization (ITO). It was signed by 23 nations in Geneva on 30 October 1947, and was applied on a provisional basis 1 January 1948. It remained in effect until 1 January 1995, when the World Trade Organization (WTO) was established after agreement by 123 nations in Marrakesh on 15 April 1994, as part of the Uruguay Round Agreements. The WTO is the successor to the GATT, and the original GATT text (GATT 1947) is still in effect under the WTO framework, subject to the modifications of GATT 1994. Nations that were not party in 1995 to the GATT need to meet the minimum conditions spelled out in specific documents before they can accede; in September 2019, the list contained 36 nations.

The GATT, and its successor the WTO, have succeeded in reducing tariffs. The average tariff levels for the major GATT participants were about 22% in 1947, but were 5% after the Uruguay Round in 1999. Experts attribute part of these tariff changes to GATT and the WTO.

History
The General Agreement on Tariffs and Trade is a multi-national trade treaty. It has been updated in a series of global trade negotiations consisting of nine rounds between 1947 and 1995. Its role in international trade was largely succeeded in 1995 by the World Trade Organization.

During the 1940s, the United States sought to establish a set of post-war multilateral institutions, one of which would be devoted to the reconstruction of world trade. In 1945 and 1946, the U.S. took concrete steps to bring about such an organisation, proposing a conference to negotiate a charter for a trade organisation. The GATT was first conceived at the 1947 United Nations Conference on Trade and Employment (UNCTE), at which the International Trade Organization (ITO) was one of the ideas proposed. It was hoped that the ITO would be run alongside the World Bank and the International Monetary Fund (IMF). More than 50 nations negotiated ITO and organising its founding charter, but after the withdrawal of the United States these negotiations collapsed.

Initial round 
Preparatory sessions were held simultaneously at the UNCTE regarding the GATT. After several of these sessions, 23 nations signed the GATT on 30 October 1947 in Geneva, Switzerland. It came into force on 1 January 1948.

Annecy Round: 1949

The second round took place in 1949 in Annecy, France. 13 countries took part in the round. The main focus of the talks was more tariff reductions, around 5,000 in total.

Torquay Round: 1951

The third round occurred in Torquay, England in 1951. Thirty-eight countries took part in the round. 8,700 tariff concessions were made totalling the remaining amount of tariffs to ¾ of the tariffs which were in effect in 1948. The contemporaneous rejection by the U.S. of the Havana Charter signified the establishment of the GATT as a governing world body.

Geneva Round: 1955–56

The fourth round returned to Geneva in 1955 and lasted until May 1956. Twenty-six countries took part in the round. $2.5 billion in tariffs were eliminated or reduced.

Dillon Round: 1960–62

The fifth round occurred once more in Geneva and lasted from 1960 to 1962. The talks were named after U.S. Treasury Secretary and former Under Secretary of State, Douglas Dillon, who first proposed the talks. Twenty-six countries took part in the round. Along with reducing over $4.9 billion in tariffs, it also yielded discussion relating to the creation of the European Economic Community (EEC).

Kennedy Round: 1964–67

The sixth round of GATT multilateral trade negotiations, held from 1964 to 1967. It was named after U.S. President John F. Kennedy in recognition of his support for the reformulation of the United States trade agenda, which resulted in the Trade Expansion Act of 1962. This Act gave the President the widest-ever negotiating authority.

As the Dillon Round went through the laborious process of item-by-item tariff negotiations, it became clear, long before the Round ended, that a more comprehensive approach was needed to deal with the emerging challenges resulting from the formation of the European Economic Community (EEC) and EFTA, as well as Europe's re-emergence as a significant international trader more generally.

Japan's high economic growth rate portended the major role it would play later as an exporter, but the focal point of the Kennedy Round always was the United States-EEC relationship. Indeed, there was an influential American view that saw what became the Kennedy Round as the start of a transatlantic partnership that might ultimately lead to a transatlantic economic community.

To an extent, this view was shared in Europe, but the process of European unification created its own stresses under which the Kennedy Round at times became a secondary focus for the EEC. An example of this was the French veto in January 1963, before the round had even started, on membership by the United Kingdom.

Another was the internal crisis of 1965, which ended in the Luxembourg Compromise. Preparations for the new round were immediately overshadowed by the Chicken War, an early sign of the impact variable levies under the Common Agricultural Policy would eventually have. Some participants in the Round had been concerned that the convening of UNCTAD, scheduled for 1964, would result in further complications, but its impact on the actual negotiations was minimal.

In May 1963 Ministers reached agreement on three negotiating objectives for the round:

 Measures for the expansion of trade of developing countries as a means of furthering their economic development,
 Reduction or elimination of tariffs and other barriers to trade, and
 Measures for access to markets for agricultural and other primary products.

The working hypothesis for the tariff negotiations was a linear tariff cut of 50% with the smallest number of exceptions. A drawn-out argument developed about the trade effects a uniform linear cut would have on the dispersed rates (low and high tariffs quite far apart) of the United States as compared to the much more concentrated rates of the EEC which also tended to be in the lower held of United States tariff rates.

The EEC accordingly argued for an evening-out or harmonisation of peaks and troughs through its cerement, double cart and thirty: ten proposals. Once negotiations had been joined, the lofty working hypothesis was soon undermined. The special-structure countries (Australia, Canada, New Zealand and South Africa), so called because their exports were dominated by raw materials and other primary commodities, negotiated their tariff reductions entirely through the item-by-item method.

In the end, the result was an average 35% reduction in tariffs, except for textiles, chemicals, steel and other sensitive products; plus a 15% to 18% reduction in tariffs for agricultural and food products. In addition, the negotiations on chemicals led to a provisional agreement on the abolition of the American Selling Price (ASP). This was a method of valuing some chemicals used by the noted States for the imposition of import duties which gave domestic manufacturers a much higher level of protection than the tariff schedule indicated.

However, this part of the outcome was disallowed by Congress, and the American Selling Price was not abolished until Congress adopted the results of the Tokyo Round. The results on agriculture overall were poor. The most notable achievement was agreement on a Memorandum of Agreement on Basic Elements for the Negotiation of a World Grants Arrangement, which eventually was rolled into a new International Grains Arrangement.

The EEC claimed that for it the main result of the negotiations on agriculture was that they "greatly helped to define its own common policy". The developing countries, who played a minor role throughout the negotiations in this round, benefited nonetheless from substantial tariff cuts particularly in non-agricultural items of interest to them.

Their main achievement at the time, however, was seen to be the adoption of Part IV of the GATT, which absolved them from according reciprocity to developed countries in trade negotiations. In the view of many developing countries, this was a direct result of the call at UNCTAD I for a better trade deal for them.

There has been argument ever since whether this symbolic gesture was a victory for them, or whether it ensured their exclusion in the future from meaningful participation in the multilateral trading system. On the other hand, there was no doubt that the extension of the Long-Term Arrangement Regarding International Trade in Cotton Textiles, which later became the Multi-Fiber Arrangement, for three years until 1970 led to the longer-term impairment of export opportunities for developing countries.

Another outcome of the Kennedy Round was the adoption of an Anti-dumping Code, which gave more precise guidance on the implementation of Article VI of the GATT. In particular, it sought to ensure speedy and fair investigations, and it imposed limits on the retrospective application of anti-dumping measures.

Kennedy Round took place from 1962 to 1967. $40 billion in tariffs were eliminated or reduced.

Tokyo Round: 1973–79

Reduced tariffs and established new regulations aimed at controlling the proliferation of non-tariff barriers and voluntary export restrictions. 102 countries took part in the round. Concessions were made on $19 billion worth of trade.

Formation of Quadrilateral Group: 1981
The Quadrilateral Group was formed in 1982 by the European Union, the United States, Japan and Canada, to influence the GATT.

Uruguay Round: 1986–94

The Uruguay Round began in 1986. It was the most ambitious round to date, as of 1986, hoping to expand the competence of the GATT to important new areas such as services, capital, intellectual property, textiles, and agriculture. 123 countries took part in the round. The Uruguay Round was also the first set of multilateral trade negotiations in which developing countries had played an active role.

Agriculture was essentially exempted from previous agreements as it was given special status in the areas of import quotas and export subsidies, with only mild caveats. However, by the time of the Uruguay round, many countries considered the exception of agriculture to be sufficiently glaring that they refused to sign a new deal without some movement on agricultural products. These fourteen countries came to be known as the "Cairns Group", and included mostly small and medium-sized agricultural exporters such as Australia, Brazil, Canada, Indonesia, and New Zealand.

The Agreement on Agriculture of the Uruguay Round continues to be the most substantial trade liberalisation agreement in agricultural products in the history of trade negotiations. The goals of the agreement were to improve market access for agricultural products, reduce domestic support of agriculture in the form of price-distorting subsidies and quotas, eliminate over time export subsidies on agricultural products and to harmonise to the extent possible sanitary and phytosanitary measures between member countries.

GATT and the World Trade Organization

In 1993, the GATT was updated ('GATT 1994') to include new obligations upon its signatories. One of the most significant changes was the creation of the World Trade Organization (WTO). The 76 existing GATT members and the European Communities became the founding members of the WTO on 1 January 1995. The other 51 GATT members rejoined the WTO in the following two years (the last being Congo in 1997). Since the founding of the WTO, 33 new non-GATT members have joined and 22 are currently negotiating membership. There are a total of 164 member countries in the WTO, with Liberia and Afghanistan being the newest members as of 2018.

Of the original GATT members, Syria, Lebanon and the SFR Yugoslavia have not rejoined the WTO. Since FR Yugoslavia (renamed as Serbia and Montenegro and with membership negotiations later split in two), is not recognised as a direct SFRY successor state; therefore, its application is considered a new (non-GATT) one. The General Council of WTO, on 4 May 2010, agreed to establish a working party to examine the request of Syria for WTO membership. The contracting parties who founded the WTO ended official agreement of the "GATT 1947" terms on 31 December 1995. Montenegro became a member in 2012, while Serbia is in the decision stage of the negotiations and is expected to become a member of the WTO in the future.

Whilst GATT was a set of rules agreed upon by nations, the WTO is an intergovernmental organisation with its own headquarters and staff, and its scope includes both traded goods and trade within the service sector and intellectual property rights. Although it was designed to serve multilateral agreements, during several rounds of GATT negotiations (particularly the Tokyo Round) plurilateral agreements created selective trading and caused fragmentation among members. WTO arrangements are generally a multilateral agreement settlement mechanism of GATT.

Effects on trade liberalisation 
The average tariff levels for the major GATT participants were about 22 per cent in 1947. As a result of the first negotiating rounds, tariffs were reduced in the GATT core of the United States, United Kingdom, Canada, and Australia, relative to other contracting parties and non-GATT participants. By the Kennedy round (1962–67), the average tariff levels of GATT participants were about 15%. After the Uruguay Round, tariffs were under 5%.

In addition to facilitating applied tariff reductions, the early GATT's contribution to trade liberalisation "include binding the negotiated tariff reductions for an extended period (made more permanent in 1955), establishing the generality of non-discrimination through most-favoured nation (MFN) treatment and national treatment status, ensuring increased transparency of trade policy measures, and providing a forum for future negotiations and for the peaceful resolution of bilateral disputes. All of these elements contributed to the rationalization of trade policy and the reduction of trade barriers and policy uncertainty."

According to Dartmouth economic historian Douglas Irwin,

The prosperity of the world economy over the past half century owes a great deal to the growth of world trade which, in turn, is partly the result of farsighted officials who created the GATT. They established a set of procedures giving stability to the trade-policy environment and thereby facilitating the rapid growth of world trade. With the long run in view, the original GATT conferees helped put the world economy on a sound foundation and thereby improved the livelihood of hundreds of millions of people around the world.

Article 24 

Following the United Kingdom's vote to withdraw from the European Union, supporters of leaving the EU suggested that Article 24, paragraph 5B of the treaty could be used to maintain a "standstill" in trading conditions between the UK and the EU in the event of the UK leaving the EU without a trade deal, hence preventing the introduction of tariffs. According to proponents of this approach, it could be used to implement an interim agreement pending negotiation of a final agreement lasting up to ten years.

This claim formed the basis of the so-called "Malthouse compromise" between Conservative party factions as to how to replace the withdrawal agreement. However, this plan was rejected by parliament. The claim that Article 24 might be used was also adopted by Boris Johnson during his 2019 campaign to lead the Conservative Party.

The claim that Article 24 might be used in this way has been criticised by Mark Carney, Liam Fox and others as being unrealistic given the requirement in paragraph 5c of the treaty that there be an agreement between the parties for paragraph 5b to be of use as, in the event of a "no-deal" scenario, there would be no agreement. Moreover, critics of the GATT 24 approach point out that services would not be covered by such an arrangement.

See also
 Cultural exception
 GATT special and differential treatment
 Most favoured nation

References

Further reading
 Aaronson Susan A. (1996). Trade and the American Dream: A Social History of Postwar Trade Policy & Co.
 Goldstein, Judith (11 May 2017). "Trading in the Twenty-First Century: Is There a Role for the World Trade Organization?". Annual Review of Political Science. 20 (1): 545–564. 
 Irwin, Douglas A. "The GATT in Historical Perspective," American Economic Review Vol. 85, No. 2, (May 1995), pp. 323–28. .
 McKenzie, Francine (Summer 2008). "GATT and the Cold War," Journal of Cold War Studies. 10#3 pp. 78–109.
 Zeiler, Thomas W. (1999). Free Trade, Free World: The Advent of GATT. excerpt and text search

External links
Trade Talks Episode 9: Happy 70th GATTiversary—The Origins of Multilateral Trade
GATT Digital Library 1947–1994 at Stanford University
The WTO and Global Trade at PBS
BBCnews World/Europe country profile
Text of GATT 1947
Text of GATT 1994

 
World Trade Organization
1947 in Switzerland
Commercial treaties
Treaties concluded in 1947
Treaties entered into force in 1948
Treaties of Antigua and Barbuda
Treaties of Argentina
Treaties of Australia
Treaties of Austria
Treaties of Bahrain
Treaties of Bangladesh
Treaties of Barbados
Treaties of Belgium
Treaties of Belize
Treaties of the Second Brazilian Republic
Treaties of Brunei
Treaties of Canada
Treaties of Chile
Treaties of the Republic of China (1912–1949)
Treaties of Costa Rica
Treaties of Ivory Coast
Treaties of the Czech Republic
Treaties of Czechoslovakia
Treaties of Denmark
Treaties of Dominica
Treaties of the Dominican Republic
Treaties entered into by the European Union
Treaties of Finland
Treaties of the French Fourth Republic
Treaties of Gabon
Treaties of West Germany
Treaties of Ghana
Treaties of the Kingdom of Greece
Treaties of Guyana
Treaties of Haiti
Treaties of Honduras
Treaties of Hungary
Treaties of Iceland
Treaties of the Dominion of India
Treaties of Indonesia
Treaties of Ireland
Treaties of Italy
Treaties of Japan
Treaties of Kenya
Treaties of South Korea
Treaties of Kuwait
Treaties of Liberia
Treaties of Luxembourg
Treaties of Macau
Treaties of Malaysia
Treaties of Malta
Treaties of Mauritius
Treaties of Mexico
Treaties of Morocco
Treaties of Myanmar
Treaties of Namibia
Treaties of the Netherlands
Treaties of New Zealand
Treaties of Nicaragua
Treaties of Nigeria
Treaties of Norway
Treaties of the Dominion of Pakistan
Treaties of Paraguay
Treaties of Peru
Treaties of the Philippines
Treaties of Poland
Treaties of Portugal
Treaties of Romania
Treaties of Saint Lucia
Treaties of Saint Vincent and the Grenadines
Treaties of Senegal
Treaties of Singapore
Treaties of Slovakia
Treaties of the Union of South Africa
Treaties of Southern Rhodesia
Treaties of Spain
Treaties of the Dominion of Ceylon
Treaties of Suriname
Treaties of Eswatini
Treaties of Sweden
Treaties of Switzerland
Treaties of Syria
Treaties of Tanzania
Treaties of Thailand
Treaties of Trinidad and Tobago
Treaties of Uganda
Treaties of the United Kingdom
Treaties of the United States
Treaties of Uruguay
Treaties of Venezuela
Treaties of Yugoslavia
Treaties of Zambia
Treaties extended to the Belgian Congo
Treaties extended to Curaçao and Dependencies
Treaties extended to Surinam (Dutch colony)
Treaties extended to the Dutch East Indies
Treaties extended to Greenland
Treaties extended to French Equatorial Africa
Treaties extended to French West Africa
Treaties extended to French Somaliland
Treaties extended to French Polynesia
Treaties extended to New Caledonia
Treaties extended to the New Hebrides
Treaties extended to Guadeloupe
Treaties extended to French Guiana
Treaties extended to French Indochina
Treaties extended to French Madagascar
Treaties extended to Martinique
Treaties extended to Réunion
Treaties extended to Saint Pierre and Miquelon
Treaties extended to the French Protectorate of Tunisia
Treaties extended to the Colony of Aden
Treaties extended to the Aden Protectorate
Treaties extended to Anglo-Egyptian Sudan
Treaties extended to the Colony of the Bahamas
Treaties extended to Bahrain (protectorate)
Treaties extended to the Colony of Barbados
Treaties extended to Basutoland
Treaties extended to the Bechuanaland Protectorate
Treaties extended to Bermuda
Treaties extended to Brunei (protectorate)
Treaties extended to British Cyprus
Treaties extended to British Dominica
Treaties extended to the Falkland Islands
Treaties extended to the Colony of Fiji
Treaties extended to the Gambia Colony and Protectorate
Treaties extended to Gibraltar
Treaties extended to the Gilbert and Ellice Islands
Treaties extended to the Gold Coast (British colony)
Treaties extended to Guernsey
Treaties extended to British Guiana
Treaties extended to British Honduras
Treaties extended to British Hong Kong
Treaties extended to the Isle of Man
Treaties extended to Jersey
Treaties extended to British Kenya
Treaties extended to the Sheikhdom of Kuwait
Treaties extended to the British Leeward Islands
Treaties extended to the British Windward Islands
Treaties extended to the Crown Colony of Malta
Treaties extended to British Mauritius
Treaties extended to the Malayan Union
Treaties extended to the Dominion of Newfoundland
Treaties extended to the Colony and Protectorate of Nigeria
Treaties extended to Nyasaland
Treaties extended to Northern Rhodesia
Treaties extended to the Pitcairn Islands
Treaties extended to Qatar (protectorate)
Treaties extended to Saint Helena, Ascension and Tristan da Cunha
Treaties extended to the Crown Colony of Seychelles
Treaties extended to the Colony of Sierra Leone
Treaties extended to the Crown Colony of Singapore
Treaties extended to the British Solomon Islands
Treaties extended to British Somaliland
Treaties extended to Swaziland (protectorate)
Treaties extended to Tanganyika (territory)
Treaties extended to the Kingdom of Tonga (1900–1970)
Treaties extended to the Crown Colony of Trinidad and Tobago
Treaties extended to the Trucial States
Treaties extended to the Uganda Protectorate
Treaties extended to the Sultanate of Zanzibar
Treaties extended to British Togoland
Treaties extended to British Cameroon
Treaties extended to the British Western Pacific Territories
History of Geneva
October 1947 events
October 1947 events in Europe